Moscow City Duma District 19 is one of 45 constituencies in Moscow City Duma. The constituency has covered parts of Eastern Moscow since 2014. From 1993-2005 District 19 was based in South-Eastern Moscow; however, after the number of constituencies was reduced to 15 in 2005, the constituency was eliminated.

Members elected

Election results

2001

|-
! colspan=2 style="background-color:#E9E9E9;text-align:left;vertical-align:top;" |Candidate
! style="background-color:#E9E9E9;text-align:left;vertical-align:top;" |Party
! style="background-color:#E9E9E9;text-align:right;" |Votes
! style="background-color:#E9E9E9;text-align:right;" |%
|-
|style="background-color:"|
|align=left|Sergey Turta
|align=left|Independent
|
|55.90%
|-
|style="background-color:"|
|align=left|Yelizaveta Makarova
|align=left|Independent
|
|12.34%
|-
|style="background-color:"|
|align=left|Yelena Gulicheva
|align=left|Yabloko
|
|9.56%
|-
|style="background-color:"|
|align=left|Vadim Artamonov
|align=left|Liberal Democratic Party
|
|4.43%
|-
|style="background-color:#000000"|
|colspan=2 |against all
|
|13.94%
|-
| colspan="5" style="background-color:#E9E9E9;"|
|- style="font-weight:bold"
| colspan="3" style="text-align:left;" | Total
| 
| 100%
|-
| colspan="5" style="background-color:#E9E9E9;"|
|- style="font-weight:bold"
| colspan="4" |Source:
|
|}

2014

|-
! colspan=2 style="background-color:#E9E9E9;text-align:left;vertical-align:top;" |Candidate
! style="background-color:#E9E9E9;text-align:left;vertical-align:top;" |Party
! style="background-color:#E9E9E9;text-align:right;" |Votes
! style="background-color:#E9E9E9;text-align:right;" |%
|-
|style="background-color:"|
|align=left|Viktor Kruglyakov
|align=left|United Russia
|
|51.30%
|-
|style="background-color:"|
|align=left|Yury Lapin
|align=left|Communist Party
|
|18.48%
|-
|style="background-color:"|
|align=left|Vera Karaseva
|align=left|Yabloko
|
|13.10%
|-
|style="background-color:"|
|align=left|Maksim Mayorov
|align=left|A Just Russia
|
|7.81%
|-
|style="background-color:"|
|align=left|Mikhail Novikov
|align=left|Liberal Democratic Party
|
|5.61%
|-
| colspan="5" style="background-color:#E9E9E9;"|
|- style="font-weight:bold"
| colspan="3" style="text-align:left;" | Total
| 
| 100%
|-
| colspan="5" style="background-color:#E9E9E9;"|
|- style="font-weight:bold"
| colspan="4" |Source:
|
|}

2019

|-
! colspan=2 style="background-color:#E9E9E9;text-align:left;vertical-align:top;" |Candidate
! style="background-color:#E9E9E9;text-align:left;vertical-align:top;" |Party
! style="background-color:#E9E9E9;text-align:right;" |Votes
! style="background-color:#E9E9E9;text-align:right;" |%
|-
|style="background-color:"|
|align=left|Oleg Sheremetyev
|align=left|Communist Party
|
|40.23%
|-
|style="background-color:"|
|align=left|Irina Nazarova
|align=left|Independent
|
|38.20%
|-
|style="background-color:"|
|align=left|Kirill Volkov
|align=left|Liberal Democratic Party
|
|9.77%
|-
|style="background-color:"|
|align=left|Roman Ilyin
|align=left|Communists of Russia
|
|7.53%
|-
| colspan="5" style="background-color:#E9E9E9;"|
|- style="font-weight:bold"
| colspan="3" style="text-align:left;" | Total
| 
| 100%
|-
| colspan="5" style="background-color:#E9E9E9;"|
|- style="font-weight:bold"
| colspan="4" |Source:
|
|}

2021

|-
! colspan=2 style="background-color:#E9E9E9;text-align:left;vertical-align:top;" |Candidate
! style="background-color:#E9E9E9;text-align:left;vertical-align:top;" |Party
! style="background-color:#E9E9E9;text-align:right;" |Votes
! style="background-color:#E9E9E9;text-align:right;" |%
|-
|style="background-color:"|
|align=left|Yelena Kats
|align=left|United Russia
|24,407
|33.95%
|-
|style="background-color:"|
|align=left|Pyotr Karmanov
|align=left|Independent
|14,662
|20.40%
|-
|style="background-color:"|
|align=left|Maksim Lapshin
|align=left|Communist Party
|6,900
|9.60%
|-
|style="background-color:"|
|align=left|Georgy Fedorov
|align=left|A Just Russia — For Truth
|5,595
|7.78%
|-
|style="background-color:"|
|align=left|Andrey Lapin
|align=left|Party of Pensioners
|4,144
|5.76%
|-
|style="background:;"| 
|align=left|Nikolay Sheremetyev
|align=left|Communists of Russia
|3,696
|5.14%
|-
|style="background-color:"|
|align=left|Mikhail Butrimov
|align=left|Independent
|2,589
|3.60%
|-
|style="background-color:"|
|align=left|Mikhail Monakhov
|align=left|Liberal Democratic Party
|2,571
|3.58%
|-
|style="background-color:"|
|align=left|Ilya Ostrovsky
|align=left|New People
|2,273
|3.16%
|-
|style="background-color:"|
|align=left|Vadim Aleksandrov
|align=left|Green Alternative
|1,455
|2.02%
|-
|style="background-color:"|
|align=left|Sergey Medvedev
|align=left|Independent
|1,229
|1.71%
|-
|style="background-color:"|
|align=left|Vladislav Romashko
|align=left|Independent
|287
|0.40%
|-
|style="background-color:"|
|align=left|Mikhail Ochkin
|align=left|Independent
|285
|0.40%
|-
| colspan="5" style="background-color:#E9E9E9;"|
|- style="font-weight:bold"
| colspan="3" style="text-align:left;" | Total
| 71,885
| 100%
|-
| colspan="5" style="background-color:#E9E9E9;"|
|- style="font-weight:bold"
| colspan="4" |Source:
|
|}

Notes

References

Moscow City Duma districts